Thittakudi is a village in the Pattukkottai taluk of Thanjavur district, Tamil Nadu, India.

Demographics 

As per the 2001 census, Thittakkudi had a total population of 450 with 213 males and 237 females. The sex ratio was 1113. The literacy rate was 53.17.

Musugundan community villages 

Sundampatti, Mattankal, Seventhanpatti, Kattayankadu Pudukkotai Ulur, Keerathur, Paalamuthi, Pallathur, Eanathi, Aladikkumulai, Soorangadu, Soorapallam, Athikkottai, Sedangadu, Thittakudi, Sembalur, Alathur, Alampalam, Pattikkadu, Pulavanchi, Karuppur, Andami, Keelakuruchi, Nemmeli, Sirankudi, Madukkur North, Vikramam, Vattakudi, Thamarankottai, Sengapaduthankadu, Mannangadu, Kasankadu, Moothakkurichi, Silambavelankadu, Nattuchalai, Vendakkottai

Temples 
 Sivan kovil
 Ayyanar kovil
 Bhairavar kovil
 Maariyamman kovil
 Veeranaar kovil

 Pattavan kovil

Ponds 
 Poovaandi kulam
 Ayyanar kulam
 Sevanthan kulam
 Vellar odai

Sports 
Volleyball and Kabadi.

References 

 

Villages in Thanjavur district